Liban is the French equivalent for Lebanon, especially in references dating to the French colonial rule of the country. It is also commonly used in official Lebanese publications and on Lebanese stamps. Liban is also a Somali given name, meaning victorious.

Liban also may refer to:

Related to Lebanon
 Air Liban or Middle East Airlines, a Lebanese national airline
 Mont-Liban, the French name for Mount Lebanon, a mountain range in Lebanon 
 Télé Liban, a Lebanese public television network

Political divisions
 Mont-Liban, for the Mount Lebanon Governorate 
 Liban-Nord, North Governorate
 Liban-Sud, South Governorate

People

Given name
 Liban Abdi (born 1988), Norwegian football player of Somali origin
 Liban Abdi Egal, Somali entrepreneur and banker
 Liban Hussein, Canadian entrepreneur and businessman
 Liban Abdulahi, Dutch professional footballer
 Liban Yusuf Osman, Deputy Minister of Health Development of Somaliland

Surname
 Abdisalam Haji Ahmed Liban (fl. 2006–2018), Somali diplomat
 Taddasa Liban (fl. 1956), Ethiopian writer
 Mohammed Awale Liban (fl. 1954–1964, Somali scholar
 Mohamed Mooge Liibaan, a prominent Somali instrumentalist and vocalist
 Ahmed Mooge Liibaan, a prominent Somali instrumentalist and vocalist

Other uses
 Lí Ban (mermaid) or Liban, legendary Irish mermaid
 Libáň, a town in Czech Republic
 Liban (or Libán), a village in Suseni, Harghita, Romania
 Liben Zone, a zone in the Somali Region of Ethiopia

See also
 
 Li Ban (288–334), Chinese monarch
 Lí Ban, Celtic goddess
 Lebanon (disambiguation)
 Liben (disambiguation)